The Star of Courage is a decoration that is the second highest award for bravery within the Canadian system of honours, and one of the three Canadian Bravery Decorations awarded by the Canadian monarch, generally through his or her viceroy-in-Council. Created in 1972, the medal is presented to both living and deceased individuals deemed to have performed "acts of conspicuous courage in circumstances of great peril," and grants recipients the ability to use post-nominal letters; for Anglophones SC, and for Francophones ÉC.

Design
On the obverse is a gold roundel at the centre of the star, bearing a maple leaf surrounded by a laurel wreath. The reverse bears on the upper arm the Royal Cypher of the reigning monarch beneath a St. Edward's Crown, symbolizing the Canadian monarch's role as the fount of honour, and the inscription COURAGE. Below this is engraved the name and rank of the recipient.

Should an individual already possessing a Star of Courage be awarded the medal again for subsequent acts of bravery, he or she is granted a medal bar, in gold and bearing a maple leaf, for wear on the ribbon from which the original medal is suspended; a small gold maple leaf is also added to the ribbon bar.

Eligibility and receipt
On 1 May 1972, Queen Elizabeth II, on the advice of her Cabinet under Prime Minister Pierre Trudeau, created the Star of Courage to recognize acts of great bravery. Any person, living or deceased, may be nominated for the Star of Courage; it is not necessary that the act of bravery take place in Canada, nor must the person who carried out the act be a Canadian. However, the event must have involved Canadians and/or Canadian interests. Nominations can be made no later than two years following either the act of bravery itself or the conclusion of any coroner's or court's inquest into the events for which the person was nominated. , the Star of Courage has been presented to 461 people.

See also
 Canadian order of precedence (decorations and medals)
 State decoration

References

External links
 
 

Military awards and decorations of Canada
Courage awards